Only Love may refer to:

Books
 Only Love, a 1997 novel by Erich Segal
 Only Love, a 1995 novel by Ann Maxwell writing as Elizabeth Lowell

Film and TV
 Only Love, a 1998 television film starring Marisa Tomei
 Only Love (TV series) (Korean: 사랑만 할래) 2014 TV series

Music
 Only Love (album), by The Armed, 2018

Songs
 "Only Love" (Anggun song), 2011
 "Only Love" (Ben Howard song), 2012
 "Only Love" (The Braxtons song), 1997
 "Only Love" (Engelbert Humperdinck/Selena song), 1997
 "Only Love" (Nana Mouskouri song), 1986
 "Only Love" (Shaggy song), 2015
 "Only Love" (Wynonna Judd song), 1993
 "Only Love", by Alkaline Trio from My Shame Is True, 2013
 "Only Love", by Brotherhood of Man from Singing a Song, 1979
 "Only Love", by Groove Coverage from Covergirl, 2002
 "Only Love", by Katy Perry from Smile, 2020
 "Only Love", by KC and the Sunshine Band from Space Cadet Solo Flight, 1981
 "Only Love", by Mary J. Blige, 2018
 "Only Love", by Mumford & Sons from Wilder Mind, 2015
 "Only Love", by Way Out West from We Love Machine, 2009
 "Only Love", by the Wildhearts from The Wildhearts Must Be Destroyed, 2003

See also 
 Only Love, L, an album by Lena Meyer-Landrut, 2019
 My Only Love (disambiguation)
 It's Only Love (disambiguation)